Lawyers' Day is celebrated across Odisha in India on April 28th every year to commemorate the birth anniversary of Madhusudan Das, an Oriya lawyer of the British era, popularly called Madhu Babu or Madhu Barrister.  

The day is also observed as Swaviman Divas. Many functions including cultural shows are organised by the Bar members throughout the state.

References

Observances in India
April observances
Law of India